The Fate of the Furious: Original Motion Picture Score is the original film score album of the 2017 action film of the same name. It was released by Back Lot Music on April 28, 2017. The score was written and composed by Brian Tyler, who also wrote and composed the musical score for the third, fourth, fifth and seventh installments.

Track listing 
All music composed by Brian Tyler.

Certifications

References

External links

2017 soundtrack albums
Fast & Furious albums
Brian Tyler soundtracks
Back Lot Music soundtracks
Action film soundtracks